The monuments of the Gettysburg Battlefield commemorate the July 1 to 3, 1863 Battle of Gettysburg in the American Civil War. Most are located within Gettysburg National Military Park; others are on private land at battle sites in and around Gettysburg, Pennsylvania. Together, they represent "one of the largest collections of outdoor sculpture in the world."

The majority of the monuments are listed as contributing structures within Gettysburg Battlefield Historic District. The historic district was approved by the Keeper of the National Register of Historic Places on January 23, 2004.

The largest concentration of monuments is at the Gettysburg National Cemetery, where President Abraham Lincoln gave his Gettysburg Address.

About this list

 Confederate and Union monuments are listed separately.
 State monuments and monuments to individuals are listed alphabetically within their sections.
 Regimental monuments are grouped within a state's section by type: Artillery / Cavalry / Infantry / Other (engineers, militia, reserves, sharpshooters).
 Maryland has a section on both the Confederate and Union lists.
 Most of the listings include the monument's GPS coordinates.

Confederate monuments

United States monuments

Other monuments

References

External links
 72nd Pennsylvania Infantry, 2nd Brigade, 2nd Division, HMDB

01
List of monuments and memorials
Gettysburg Battlefield
Gettysburg Battlefield
Gettysburg Battlefield
monuments of the Gettysburg Battlefield